Taboon bread is Levantine flatbread baked in a taboon or tannur 'tandoor' clay oven, similar to the various tandoor breads found in many parts of Asia. It is used as a base or wrap in many cuisines, and eaten with different accompaniments.

Variations

Taboon bread is an important part of Palestinian cuisine, traditionally baked on a bed of small hot stones in the taboon oven. It is the base of musakhan, often considered the national dish of Palestine. Gustaf Dalman, a German orientalist, documented its making in Palestine in the early 20th-century, among other types of breads. In Palestine, folded flat-bread was often filled with a spinach and onion mixture, or with cheese curds and onion mixture, or with raisins and pine nuts. The ordinary taboon-bread was slightly smaller in size than the ordinary tannur-bread. Over the centuries, bread-making in communal taboons played an important social role for women in Palestinian villages.

In Israel, a popular flatbread known as laffa, Iraqi pita, or in Jerusalem ashtanur, is typically baked in a tannur or taboon. It is common at bakeries, and at food stands where it is mostly used to wrap shawarma or other food.

See also

 Lahmacun
 Manakish

References

Jordanian cuisine
Flatbreads
Iraqi cuisine
Israeli cuisine
Palestinian cuisine
Lebanese cuisine
Levantine cuisine
Mediterranean cuisine
Syrian cuisine
Turkish cuisine
Emirati breads
Emirati cuisine
Yemeni cuisine
Stuffed dishes